Smilax zeylanica is a plant species in the genus Smilax. Its leaves and roots are used for medicinal purposes. The plant is widespread in India, and native in other parts of the Indian Subcontinent as well as in Myanmar, Malaysia, Java and  Solomon Islands. It is traditionally used for the treatment of ulcers. It is one of the larval host plants of the butterfly Zesius chrysomallus.

References

External links

Smilacaceae
Flora of Asia
Flora of the Solomon Islands (archipelago)
Plants used in Ayurveda
Plants described in 1753
Taxa named by Carl Linnaeus